Tansen (c. 1500–1586) was a figure of Hindustani classical music. 

Tansen may also refer to:

 Sangeet Samrat Tansen, 1962 film
 Tansen (film), 1943 film
 Tansen Durbar, building
 Tansen Pande (1910–1966), prominent Dhrupad singer
 Tansen Samaroh, festival
 Tansen, Nepal, place in Palpa District of Nepal